The PCA Player of the Year Awards are a set of annual cricket awards. Awards are given for the Men's Player of the Year, Women's Player of the Year, Men's Young Player of the Year and Women's Young Player of the Year, presented to the player who is adjudged to have been the best of the year in their respective category. The winner is chosen by a vote amongst the members of the players' trade union, the Professional Cricketers' Association (PCA).

The Men's Player of the Year award was first awarded in 1970, whilst the Men's Young Player of the Year award began in 1990. An award named the Women's Player of the Summer was first awarded in 2014, presented to a member of the England women's cricket team who was adjudged to have been the best during that summer. However, in 2021, the awarded was opened up to domestic players, and named the Women's Player of the Year. Finally, the Women's Young Player of the Year award was established in 2021.

History

Men's Player of the Year
The winning player is awarded the Reg Hayter Cup, named after a sports journalist who was also a member of the Marylebone Cricket Club, a Lord's Taverner, and a life-member of Surrey County Cricket Club. With the exception of the first year, when a joint award was made, the award has been bestowed upon one individual each season. The award is well regarded by its recipients; the 2014 winner, Adam Lyth exemplified this by claiming that "it's a very proud moment to be voted for by your peers who you’ve played against all year."

The award was first presented in 1970, when Mike Proctor of Gloucestershire and Jack Bond of Lancashire were joint winners. Seven players have won the award more than once, but only Sir Richard Hadlee (1981, 1984 and 1987) and Marcus Trescothick (2000, 2009 and 2011) have been named Player of the Year on three occasions. Two players, Andrew Flintoff and John Lever, have won the award in consecutive years. Representatives of all eighteen first-class cricket counties have won the award. Gloucestershire players have collected the award most frequently, doing so on six occasions, while four of the counties (Derbyshire, Glamorgan, Leicestershire and Sussex) have only had one winner.

On nineteen occasions, the PCA Player of the Year has also been named one of the five Wisden Cricketers of the Year for that season, and in 2005 Flintoff won the PCA award in the same year as being voted BBC Sports Personality of the Year. The Cricket Writers' Club County Championship Player of the Year was introduced in 2012, and two of the three winners of that award have been the PCA Player of the Year at the same time.

Men's Young Player of the Year
The winning player is awarded the John Arlott Cup, named after John Arlott, a cricket journalist and commentator. The award is presented to the player who is adjudged to be the most promising young player in English county cricket. Only players that are aged under 24 on 1 April of the awarding year are eligible for the prize.

Michael Atherton was the first winner of the award in 1990. Two players, Kabir Ali and Alastair Cook, have won the award twice, both doing so in successive years; Ali in 2002 and 2003, and Cook in 2005 and 2006. Representatives of thirteen of the eighteen first-class counties have won the award. Yorkshire players have collected the most awards, doing so on six occasions. 

On three occasions the PCA Young Player of the Year has also been named one of the five Wisden Cricketers of the Year; Atherton in 1990, Ben Duckett in 2016 and Jamie Porter in 2017. Duckett is the only player to have won both major PCA awards in the same year, as he was also named PCA Player of the Year in 2016.  18 of the 31 winners have also collected the Cricket Writers' Club Young Cricketer of the Year award, chosen by members of the Cricket Writers' Club, an association of cricket journalists.

Women's Player of the Year

First awarded in 2014, the award was originally presented to the member of the England women's cricket team who is adjudged to have been the best of the English summer, as per a vote amongst the members of the team, as the Women's Player of the Summer. Prior to 2014, women had not held professional contracts, and so had not been eligible for membership of the players' trade union, the Professional Cricketers' Association (PCA). With the professionalisation of parts of the domestic game during 2020, the award was opened up to domestic players for the 2021 award, with Evelyn Jones becoming the first Women's Player of the Year for her performances for Central Sparks and Birmingham Phoenix.

Women's Young Player of the Year
The award was first introduced in 2021, again as part of the further professionalisation of women's domestic cricket. The first winner was Alice Capsey of South East Stars and Oval Invincibles, who was not a professional cricketer or PCA member at the time of her win.

Winners

See also
 Wisden Cricketers of the Year
 Cricket Writers' Club County Championship Player of the Year
 Cricket Writers' Club Young Cricketer of the Year

Notes

References
General
 

Specific

Cricket awards and rankings
Awards established in 1970
Sports awards honoring women